The 1976–77 Scottish Second Division was won by Stirling Albion who, along with second placed Alloa Athletic, were promoted to the First Division. Forfar Athletic finished bottom.

Table

References 

 Rsssf

Scottish Second Division seasons
3
Scot